Freestyle skiing at the 2020 Winter Youth Olympics took place in Leysin and Villars, Switzerland.

Events

Medal table

Boys' events

Girls' events

Qualification

Summary

References

External links
Results Book – Freestyle Skiing

 
Youth Olympics
2020 Winter Youth Olympics events
2020